Kensington is an inner city suburb of Port Elizabeth in South Africa.

References

Port Elizabeth
Populated places in Nelson Mandela Bay